George Allen Frazier (born October 13, 1954) is a former professional baseball player who pitched in the Major Leagues from 1978–1987, primarily as a set-up reliever.

Frazier played high school baseball as a member of "the Hornets", which is the name of the teams at Hillcrest High School in Springfield, Missouri. Frazier was offered a college scholarship in baseball, football, and basketball.

He was traded from the Milwaukee Brewers to the St. Louis Cardinals for Buck Martinez during the Winter Meetings on December 8, 1977.

In 1981 while with the Yankees, Frazier tied a World Series record (with Lefty Williams) with 3 losses. Williams, however, is widely suspected to have thrown those games in the 1919 World Series (as part of the Black Sox Scandal), and furthermore, the third game Williams lost was Game Eight - the Series of 1919 through 1921 were best of nine affairs, leaving Frazier as the only pitcher to lose three games in a best of seven World Series.

Frazier later won a world championship as a member of the Twins.

Frazier served as a color analyst for Twins in 1993 and for the Colorado Rockies from 1998 until 2015. Since then he's been doing color commentary for Fox Sports during the Big 12 Baseball championship broadcasts. A son, Matthew Frazier, served as a detective for the Tulsa Police Department and appeared on the A&E television show The First 48. Another son, Parker Frazier, was drafted in the eighth round of the 2007 MLB Draft by the Colorado Rockies. His daughter, Georgia Frazier, was crowned Miss Oklahoma 2015.

References

External links

1954 births
Living people
Águilas Cibaeñas players
American expatriate baseball players in the Dominican Republic
Baseball players from Oklahoma
Chicago Cubs players
Cleveland Indians players
Colorado Rockies announcers
Major League Baseball broadcasters
Major League Baseball pitchers
Minnesota Twins announcers
Minnesota Twins players
New York Yankees players
Sportspeople from Oklahoma City
St. Louis Cardinals players
Burlington Bees players
Columbus Clippers players
Holyoke Millers players
Newark Co-Pilots players
Spokane Indians players
Springfield Redbirds players